Philippines participated in the 2010 Asian Para Games–First Asian Para Games in Guangzhou, China from 13 to 19 December 2010. Athletes from Philippines won total seven medals, and finished at the 21st spot, tied with Syria in a medal table.

Medalist

Silver

Bronze

Medal summary

By sports

References

Nations at the 2010 Asian Para Games
2010 in the Philippines
Philippines at the Asian Para Games